Aracaju is the capital of the state of Sergipe, Brazil, located in the northeastern part of the country on the coast, about 350 km (217 mi) north of Salvador. According to the 2020 estimate, the city has 664,908 inhabitants, which represents approximately 33% of the state population. Adding to the populations of the municipalities forming the Metropolitan area: Barra dos Coqueiros, Nossa Senhora do Socorro and São Cristóvão. Its Metropolitan Cathedral Nossa Senhora da Conceiçao, dedicated to Our Lady of Immaculate Conception, is the archiepiscopal see of the Roman Catholic Archdiocese of Aracaju.

History 

The extinct unclassified Boime language (also spelled Poyme) was spoken by indigenous peoples near Aracajú on the São Francisco River.

The land of present-day Aracaju was located in a sesmaria given to Pero Gonçalves by the Portuguese crown around 1602. A village called Santo Antônio de Aracaju was recorded in 1699. It was located at the mouth of the Sergipe River at the Atlantic Ocean, and was founded by João Mulato, an indigenous Brazilian. The settlement saw little growth in the 18th century, and was part of the parish of Nossa Senhora do Perpétuo Socorro do Tomar do Cotinguiba. The capital of São Cristóvão presented numerous difficulties as the capital of Sergipe, primarily its inland location. São Cristóvão had only a small port on a river, and was accessed only with small boats. As a result, large ships were unable to land in Sergipe. Government officials in Sergipe began a search for land for a new capital in the 1850s. The beach that is now located in Aracaju near the mouth of the Sergipe River was a major point of interest. The state government transferred the customs and the Provincial Revenue Bureau to that location. They additionally built a post office and police sub-station. In addition, a port was built on the beach, called Atalaia.

The capital of the state of Sergipe was moved from São Cristóvão to Aracaju on March 17, 1855.

Economy 
The economy is based on services and industry.

In recent years, the city has been invigorated by major investors from both eastern Europe (especially from Belarus and Russia) and China setting to be a key city on the Brics relations worldwide as well as a 'Mercocity' (adopted from Mercosur).

Tourism and recreation 
The city has emerged as a good choice in low-cost tourism. Seen and recognized as one of the safest (63 murders per 100,000; No. 12 city in world; List of cities by murder rate) capitals in the Northeast region and the lowest costs of living in the country, more recently has focused its tourism business in creating quality accommodation, such as world-renowned hostels. Planned public transportation improvements were aimed at increasing the comfort and integration to the visitors users. In advance of seeking access facilities, bus lines have been reformed and can be monitored in real time here

Sports 
At the 2016 Summer Olympics the city hosted teams from seven countries. Football athletes from Japan and gymnasts and swimmers curiously mostly from many eastern European countries like Poland, Austria, Belarus, Kazakhstan, Ukraine and Czech Republic established the city as home-base for training.

For the 2016 Summer Paralympics Games the city is accommodating athletes from Eurasian Economic Community countries  such as the Kazakhstani paralympic team and the Belarus paralympic team, including paralympic swimmer champion Ihar Boki.

Transportation

Air
Aracaju is served by Santa Maria Airport, a domestic commercial airport. It dates to 1952 and became fully functional in 1958.

Roads
Aracaju is located on the northern segment of BR-101, a major north–south longitudinal highway in Brazil. It is also the easternmost point of BR-235, an incomplete highway which is projected to run from Aracaju west to Novo Progresso, Pará.

Educational institutions
 Federal University of Sergipe
 Universidade Norte do Paraná (Unopar)

Geography

Climate
Aracaju's climate is hot and humid, and the city experiences a tropical monsoon climate.

However, it may happen that the temperature gets warmer in “winter” and cooler in “summer,” as in 2002.

Aracaju experiences its wettest months between March and July, owing to the strong wind created by lower temperatures in the South and Southeast. The driest months, between September and February, see the winds weakening and only really managing to bring light clouds. There is also less rain.

References

External links 

Pictures of the city

 
Municipalities in Sergipe